The colonization of Venus has been a subject of many works of science fiction since before the dawn of spaceflight, and is still discussed from both a fictional and a scientific standpoint. However, with the discovery of Venus's extremely hostile surface environment, attention has largely shifted towards the colonization of the Moon and Mars instead, with proposals for Venus focused on habitats floating in the upper-middle atmosphere and on terraforming.

Background

Space colonization is a step beyond space exploration, and implies the permanent or long-term presence of humans in an environment outside Earth. Colonization of space was claimed by Stephen Hawking to be the best way to ensure the survival of humans as a species. Other reasons for colonizing space include economic interests, long-term scientific research best carried out by humans as opposed to robotic probes, and sheer curiosity. Venus is the second largest terrestrial planet and Earth's closest neighbor, which makes it a potential target.

With discoveries as of 2020 of traces of possibly indigenous life in the atmosphere of Venus, attempts of any humanization of Venus have become an increased issue of planetary protection, since uncontrolled effects of human presence might endanger such life.

Advantages

Venus has certain similarities to Earth which, if not for the hostile conditions, might make colonization easier in many respects in comparison with other possible destinations. These similarities, and its proximity, have led Venus to be called Earth's "sister planet".

At present it has not been established whether the gravity of Mars, 0.38 times that of the Earth, would be sufficient to avoid bone decalcification and loss of muscle tone experienced by astronauts living in a micro-g environment. In contrast, Venus is close in size and mass to the Earth, resulting in a similar surface gravity (0.904 g) that would likely be sufficient to prevent the health problems associated with weightlessness. Most other space exploration and colonization plans face concerns about the damaging effect of long-term exposure to fractional g or zero gravity on the human musculoskeletal system.

Venus's relative proximity makes transportation and communications easier than for most other locations in the Solar System. With current propulsion systems, launch windows to Venus occur every 584 days, compared to the 780 days for Mars. Flight time is also somewhat shorter; the Venus Express probe that arrived at Venus in April 2006 spent slightly over five months en route, compared to nearly six months for Mars Express.

Venus's atmosphere is made mostly out of carbon dioxide. At this height, the temperature is a manageable . At  higher, it is a temperate  (see ).

The atmosphere also provides the various elements required for human life and agriculture: carbon, hydrogen, oxygen, nitrogen, and sulfur.

Additionally, the upper atmosphere could provide protection from harmful solar radiation comparable to the protection provided by  Earth's atmosphere. The atmosphere of Mars, as well as the Moon provide little such protection.

Difficulties 

Venus also presents several significant challenges to human colonization. These conditions have caused missions to the surface to be extremely brief: the Soviet Venera 5 and Venera 6 probes were crushed by high pressure while still 18 km above the surface. Following landers such as Venera 7 and Venera 8 succeeded in transmitting data after reaching the surface, but these missions were brief as well, surviving no more than a single hour on the surface.

Furthermore, water, in any form, is almost entirely absent from Venus. The atmosphere is devoid of molecular oxygen and is primarily carbon dioxide. In addition, the visible clouds are composed of corrosive sulfuric acid and sulfur dioxide vapor.

Exploration and research

Over 20 successful space missions have visited Venus since 1962. The last European probe was ESA's Venus Express, which was in polar orbit around the planet from 2006 to 2014. A Japanese probe, Akatsuki, failed in its first attempt to orbit Venus, but successfully reinserted itself into orbit on 7 December 2015.

Aerostat habitats and floating cities

At least as early as 1971 Soviet scientists had suggested that rather than attempting to settle Venus' hostile surface, humans might attempt to settle the Venusian atmosphere. Geoffrey A. Landis of NASA's Glenn Research Center has summarized the perceived difficulties in colonizing Venus as being merely from the assumption that a colony would need to be based on the surface of a planet:

Landis has proposed aerostat habitats followed by floating cities, based on the concept that breathable air (21:79 oxygen/nitrogen mixture) is a lifting gas in the dense carbon dioxide atmosphere, with over 60% of the lifting power that helium has on Earth. In effect, a balloon full of human-breathable air would sustain itself and extra weight (such as a colony) in midair. Protection against cosmic radiation would be provided by the atmosphere above, with shielding mass equivalent to Earth's.

Compared to the Venusian solar day of 118 Earth days, colonies freely floating in this region could therefore have a much shorter day-night cycle. Allowing a colony to move freely would also reduce structural stress from the wind that they would experience if tethered to the ground.

At its most extreme, the entirety of Venus could be covered in aerostats, forming an artificial planetary surface. This would be supported by the atmosphere compressed beneath it.

Advantages
Because there is not a significant pressure difference between the inside and the outside of the breathable-air balloon, any rips or tears would cause gases to diffuse at normal atmospheric mixing rates rather than an explosive decompression, giving time to repair any such damages. In addition, humans would not require pressurized suits when outside, merely air to breathe, protection from the acidic rain and on some occasions low level protection against heat. Alternatively, two-part domes could contain a lifting gas like hydrogen or helium (extractable from the atmosphere) to allow a higher mass density. Therefore, putting on or taking off suits for working outside would be easier. Working outside the vehicle in non-pressurized suits would also be easier.

Remaining problems
Structural and industrial materials would be hard to retrieve from the surface and expensive to bring from Earth/asteroids. The sulfuric acid itself poses a further challenge in that the colony would need to be constructed of or coated in materials resistant to corrosion by the acid, such as PTFE (a compound consisting wholly of carbon and fluorine).

Studies
In 2015, NASA developed the High Altitude Venus Operational Concept (HAVOC) for exploring the possibility of setting up an atmospheric crewed mission.

Terraforming

Venus has been the subject of a number of terraforming proposals. The proposals seek to remove or convert the dense carbon dioxide atmosphere, reduce Venus's  surface temperature, and establish a day/night light cycle closer to that of Earth.

Many proposals involve deployment of a solar shade or a system of orbital mirrors, for the purpose of reducing insolation and providing light to the dark side of Venus. Another common thread in most proposals involves some introduction of large quantities of hydrogen or water. Proposals also involve either freezing most of Venus's atmospheric CO2, or converting it to carbonates, urea or other forms.

See also 
 Colonization of Mars
 Colonization of the Moon
 Colonization of the Solar System
 Manned Venus flyby
 Observations and explorations of Venus
 Aerospace architecture

References

External links
 A Floating City on Venus – article from The Space Monitor
 NASA's Incredible, Futuristic, And Totally Real Plan To Establish A Human Colony On Venus – article from Business Insider UK

Colonization
Colonization
Venus